Marine Services Company Limited (MSCL) is a Tanzanian company that operates ferries, cargo ships and tankers on three of the African Great Lakes, namely Lake Victoria, Lake Tanganyika and Lake Nyasa. It provides services to neighbouring Burundi, DR Congo, Zambia and Malawi.

History
Prior to its incorporation in 1997, MSCL was an integral part of the Tanzania Railways Corporation, which was formed in 1977 after the dissolution of the East African Railways and Harbours Corporation.

On 21 May 1996, MV Bukoba capsized while travelling from Bukoba to Mwanza due to overloading. At least 723 people died.

Corporate affairs
MSCL is wholly owned by the Tanzanian Government via the Treasury Registrar and operates under the auspices of the Ministry of Transport. Its share capital consists of 1,000 shares each with a nominal value of TSh . The company's head office is in the northern city of Mwanza at the shores of Lake Victoria. It maintains two branch offices in Kigoma and Kyela; and liaison offices in Dar es Salaam and Kampala.

Services
Passenger services on Lake Tanganyika to neighbouring countries include Mpulungu in Zambia; Bujumbura in Burundi; and Kalemie, Uvira and Baraka in the Democratic Republic of the Congo. The company also plies on Lake Nyasa between Mbamba Bay in southern Tanzania and Nkhata Bay in Malawi.

Between July 2013 and April 2014, MSCL transported 231,866 passengers and 41,234 tonnes of cargo.

Fleet
Most of its fleet is located on Lake Victoria and includes MV Victoria, the former Royal Mail Ship.  (formerly the Imperial German Navy's SMS Graf von Goetzen) was built in 1913 and still operates on Lake Tanganyika. The company's livery appears to be the same as TRC's predecessor, the East African Railways and Harbours Corporation: white hull above the waterline, white superstructure and buff funnel. The hull below the waterline appears to be dark red.

Current

Future
In 2014, Transport Minister Harrison Mwakyembe informed the Parliament that the government's plan to purchase three new vessels from Denmark had been delayed until June 2015 because of a 163 per cent increase in costs. The acquisition will cost US$74.9 million and construction of the vessels will take three years. He also stated that discussions with the South Korean government are on-going to procure three vessels.

Accidents and incidents
 In February 2013, fire broke out on the MV Victoria whilst docked at Mwanza Port. It is believed that it was due to the welding works going on in one of the lower deck rooms and sparks of fire then passed on to the adjacent storage compartment. The situation was under control within two hours. The Surface and Marine Transport Regulatory Authority (SUMATRA) blamed the management for professional negligence.
 On 10 October 2014, MV Victoria experienced an engine failure midway on its journey from Bukoba to Mwanza.

Gallery

See also
 Lake Victoria ferries

References

External links

 

Transport companies established in 1997
Government-owned companies of Tanzania
Ferry companies of Tanzania
Dry bulk shipping companies
Tanker shipping companies
1997 establishments in Tanzania